Emily Mannix (born 16 April 1994) is an Australian netball player in the Suncorp Super Netball league, playing for the Melbourne Vixens.

Early life
Mannix attended Geelong Grammar School on a sports scholarship and played netball for Drysdale in her junior years.

Career
Originally from Geelong, Mannix made her debut for the Melbourne Vixens in 2015, working as a defensive understudy to Bianca Chatfield and Geva Mentor. She won the club Coaches Award in 2016 and was runner up in the club MVP in 2017, a run of form which culminated that year in her debut for the national team. She was selected in the Australian Diamonds squad for the 2018/19 international season.

References

External links
 Super Netball profile

Australian netball players
Melbourne Vixens players
Living people
1994 births
Suncorp Super Netball players
Netball players from Victoria (Australia)
People educated at Geelong Grammar School
Australia international netball players